Kolkata is the prime business, commercial and financial hub of eastern India and the main port of communication for the North East Indian states. Kolkata is the third largest economy in India after Mumbai and Delhi. Kolkata, with a GDP (PPP) of $150.1 billion is home to India's oldest, stock exchange company (bourse) – The Calcutta Stock Exchange. Kolkata is home to many industrial units operated by large public- and private-sector corporations; major sectors include Steel, Heavy engineering, Mining, Minerals, cement, pharmaceuticals, food processing, agriculture, electronics, textiles, and jute.

Economic history and recent developments

Kolkata was the capital of the British Indian Empire until 1911. Throughout the British Raj, the city was a major port and commercial center in the world economy. The Partition of India in 1947 was a major blow to the once flourishing economy during the world wars, it removed most of the hinterland, cutting down the supply of the human resource and a took away a huge portion of its market. Also the huge inflow of refugee from East Pakistan was a major drain to the city's infrastructure which was inadequate for the population boom. In the 1970s, the city saw a predominance of the trade-union movements which led the investors to flow out of the state to other newly emerging destinations in India. As the investors lacked trust in the newly formed communist government, the lack of capital destroyed most of its small-scale industries like foundrys and tool casting. Once India's leading city, Kolkata experienced a steady economic decline in the decades following India's independence due to steep population increases and a rise in militant trade-unionism, which included frequent strikes that were backed by left-wing parties. From the 1960s to the late 1990s, several factories were closed and businesses relocated. The lack of capital and resources added to the depressed state of the city's economy and gave rise to an unwelcome sobriquet: the "dying city".

There are a few of the oldest and front line banks and PSUs —such as UCO Bank, Allahabad Bank, United Bank of India and Geological Survey of India, Zoological Survey of India, Botanical Survey of India and Tea Board of India—were founded and is headquartered in Kolkata. The oldest operating photographic studio in the world, Bourne & Shepherd, is also based in the city. The Standard Chartered Bank has a major branch in Kolkata. Kolkata is also the headquarters of Botanical Survey of India and Zoological Survey of India and many more organisations and companies.Kolkata is 3rd richest City in India after Mumbai & New Delhi , & also the 3rd richest City in South Asia.

Kolkata is home to many industrial units operated by large public sector and private-sector corporations; major sectors include steel, heavy engineering, mining, minerals, cement, pharmaceuticals, food processing, agriculture, electronics, textiles, and jute.

Sectors

Flexible production has been the norm in Kolkata, which has an informal sector that employs more than 40% of the labour force. Over the years, the informal sector has grown in size and as a proportion of the total workforce of the Kolkata metropolitan area. One unorganised group, roadside hawkers, generated business worth  87.72 billion ( 2 billion) in 2005. , around 0.81% of the city's workforce was employed in the primary sector (agriculture, forestry, mining, etc.); 15.49% worked in the secondary sector (industrial and manufacturing); and 83.69% worked in the tertiary sector (service industries). , the majority of households in slums were engaged in occupations belonging to the informal sector; 36.5% were involved in servicing the urban middle class (as maids, drivers, etc.), and 22.2% were casual labourers. About 34% of the available labour force in Kolkata slums were unemployed.  According to one estimate, almost a quarter of the population live on less than 27 rupees (equivalent to 45 US cents) per day. Since 2017, warehousing industry in the vicinity of the city experienced significant increase, and was the fastest growing market in India, per 2019 report.

Major Companies based in Kolkata
Kolkata is home to many industrial units operated by large public- and private-sector corporations; major sectors include steel, heavy engineering, mining, minerals, cement, pharmaceuticals, food processing, agriculture, electronics, textiles, and jute.

Companies such as ITC Limited, ABP Group, CESC Limited, Exide Industries, Emami, Eveready Industries India, Lux Industries, Rupa Company, Berger Paints, Patton International Limited, Birla Corporation, Khaitan India Ltd., Peerless Group and Britannia Industries, Jai Balaji group, Shyam Steel Industries Limited are all headquartered in the city. Philips India, PricewaterhouseCoopers India, Tata Global Beverages, Tata Steel have their registered office and zonal headquarters in Kolkata. Some of the oldest public sector companies are headquartered in the city such as the Coal India Limited, National Insurance Company, Garden Reach Shipbuilders & Engineers, Tea Board of India, Geological Survey of India, Zoological Survey of India, Botanical Survey of India, Jute Corporation of India, National Test House, Hindustan Copper and the Ordnance Factories Board of the Indian Ministry of Defence, Damodar Valley Corporation and India Govt. Mint are also headquartered in the city. 
Kolkata hosts the headquarters of three major public-sector banks:Allahabad Bank, UCO Bank, and the United Bank of India and India's one of the newest private bank Bandhan Bank.

Among these three of the Forbes Global 2000 listed companies are headquartered in Kolkata, which includes ITC Limited,  Coal India  , Allahabad Bank and UCO Bank.

Banking 

Kolkata is an important centre for banking. At present, the city serves as the headquarters of large nationalised bank UCO Bank and a private scheduled bank - Bandhan Bank.  Several large financial companies and insurance companies are headquartered in Kolkata including Magma Fincorp, Bandhan Bank, SREI Infrastructure Finance, National Insurance Company. Many Indian banks, multi-national banks and the World Bank have located their Branch offices operations in the city. All main banks from India have their branch office here. Also big financial banks like Standard Chartered Bank, Bank of America and HSBC Bank have office and branches in Kolkata. Bandhan Financial, the largest Microfinance Group in India from Kolkata and 2nd largest of its kind in the World has got RBI's nod to set up banks all over India. Bandhan Bank has its Head Office in Kolkata, which is the only bank after independence to be established in the city.

Ease of doing business in Kolkata 
Kolkata has a process to obtaining trade license in the city which is unique in India. This ranking however has become better as per recent estimates. The Kolkata Municipal Corporation (KMC) is the central authority which deals with the processing of new trade licenses and the renewal of the same as well.In 2019, Kolkata, along with Bengaluru was included in the list of cities in India for the World Bank's ease of doing business survey in India, which so far covered only New Delhi and Mumbai.

Gallery

See also
Bengal Renaissance
Calcutta Stock Exchange Association Limited
HIDCO
Kolkata Metro

References